Jon Beare (born May 10, 1974) is a Canadian rower. Born in Toronto, Ontario, he started rowing in 1988 and is a graduate of the University of Western Ontario. In 1993, he participated in the Canada Games in Kamloops B.C. as a member of the Ontario Team. The team returned with a gold in the four, and a silver in the eight. The following year as a member of the National Team he won a bronze in the Men's Lightweight 8 at the 1994 Commonwealth Regatta in London, Ontario. He and his family lives in Shawnigan Lake, British Columbia, near Greater Victoria.

Beare has competed in the Olympics three times (2000, 2004 and 2008), and won a bronze in the men's lightweight fours at the 2008 Summer Olympics with Iain Brambell, Liam Parsons and Mike Lewis.

References

External links
 Profile at Rowing Canada

1974 births
Living people
Canadian male rowers
Olympic rowers of Canada
Olympic bronze medalists for Canada
Rowers from Toronto
Rowers at the 2000 Summer Olympics
Rowers at the 2004 Summer Olympics
Rowers at the 2008 Summer Olympics
University of Western Ontario alumni
Olympic medalists in rowing
Medalists at the 2008 Summer Olympics
World Rowing Championships medalists for Canada